Ivan Lendl was the defending champion but did not compete that year.

Anders Järryd won in the final 6–7, 6–1, 6–1, 6–4 against Boris Becker.

Seeds
A champion seed is indicated in bold text while text in italics indicates the round in which that seed was eliminated.

Draw

References
1986 Buick WCT Finals Draw

Singles